Periconia is a genus of sac fungi in the order Pleosporales. Fossils of Periconia have been reported from 12 million year old rocks from central England.

References

External links 
 
 

Pleosporales
Dothideomycetes genera